Philip Godfrey Reinhard (born January 12, 1941) is a senior United States district judge of the United States District Court for the Northern District of Illinois.

Education and career

Born in LaSalle, Illinois, Reinhard received a Bachelor of Arts degree from the University of Illinois at Urbana–Champaign in 1962 and a Juris Doctor from the University of Illinois College of Law in 1964. He was an assistant state's attorney of Winnebago County, Illinois from 1964 to 1967, and then in private practice in Rockford, Illinois from 1967 to 1968, returning to the Winnebago County government as a state's attorney from 1968 to 1976. He was a judge on the 17th Judicial Circuit Court of Illinois from 1976 to 1980, and on the Second District Court of Appeals, Illinois from 1980 to 1992.

Federal judicial service

On August 1, 1991, Reinhard was nominated by President George H. W. Bush to a new seat on the United States District Court for the Northern District of Illinois created by 104 Stat. 5089. He was confirmed by the United States Senate on February 6, 1992, and received his commission on February 10, 1992. He assumed senior status on January 12, 2007.

References

Sources

1941 births
Living people
Illinois state court judges
Judges of the Illinois Appellate Court
Judges of the United States District Court for the Northern District of Illinois
United States district court judges appointed by George H. W. Bush
20th-century American judges
University of Illinois Urbana-Champaign alumni
University of Illinois College of Law alumni
21st-century American judges
People from LaSalle, Illinois